Harry Solimano (April 19, 1889 – October 31, 1972) was an American football and basketball coach. He was the head football coach at St. Mary's College—now known as the University of Dayton—in 1919, tallying a mark of 2–2. Solimano was also the head basketball coach at St. Mary's from 1911 to 1914 and again in 1919–20, compiling a record of 34–14.

Head coaching record

Football

References

External links
 

1889 births
1972 deaths
American men's basketball players
Dayton Flyers football coaches
Dayton Flyers men's basketball coaches
Dayton Flyers men's basketball players